Dongola is an unincorporated community in the southern part of Liberty Township in Bollinger County, Missouri, United States. The community is located nine miles south of Marble Hill on Missouri Route 51.

The origin of the name is uncertain, but may have some connection with Dongola, a small town in Union County, Illinois. A post office was in operation between 1899–1923.

References 

Unincorporated communities in Bollinger County, Missouri
Cape Girardeau–Jackson metropolitan area
Unincorporated communities in Missouri